"What a Waster" is the debut single by English rock band the Libertines. The song received little airplay because it contains frequent profanity. "What a Waster" was initially left off the UK edition of the band's debut album Up the Bracket but was later included as the 13th track on a subsequent re-issue.

The song was used in the film The Football Factory.

Reception
NME included the song at number 96 in their list of 500 Greatest Songs of All Time, writing that the song "subscribed to all the classic pop single rules: under three minutes, catchy-as-hell, five chords max and instantly banned by broadcasters the world over."

Track listing 
All songs written by Pete Doherty and Carl Barât.
7"
 "What a Waster" – 2:58 
 "I Get Along" – 2:53

CD
 "What a Waster" – 2:58
 "I Get Along" – 2:53
 "Mayday" – 1:03

Chart performance

References

2002 songs
2002 debut singles
The Libertines songs
Rough Trade Records singles